Antje Duvekot (born 1974) is a singer-songwriter and guitarist based in Somerville, Massachusetts. She holds three top songwriting awards including the Kerrville New Folk Competition's Best New Folk Award, Boston Music Award for Outstanding Folk Act, and Grand Prize in the John Lennon Songwriting Contest.

Biography
Duvekot moved to Delaware at the age of 13. Duvekot writes songs that are often profound and personal, and she frequently records and performs with little accompaniment besides her acoustic guitar.

She began recording music on her own at the age of cassette tapes for her friends.  At 18 she won the first open mic competition she entered, at the Sam Adams Brewpub in Philadelphia.  Within a year, she had recorded a number of songs on a borrowed 4-Track tape machine, and released a self-produced full-length cassette entitled Waterstains" which she sold at gigs in and around Newark, Delaware, where she had attended the University of Delaware.

In 2000, her song "Soma" won the grand prize in the rock category of the John Lennon Songwriting Contest.

Duvekot often tours with Ellis Paul, who sings on her first studio album, Big Dream Boulevard.  Big Dream Boulevard was produced by Séamus Egan of the Irish-American band Solas.  Solas has previously recorded five of Duvekot's songs: "Black Annis," "The Poisonjester's Mask," "Erin," "Reasonland," and "Merry Go Round."

Duvekot's first two albums, Little Peppermints and Boys, Flowers, Miles, are based on recordings of live performances, although some tracks include studio overdubs as well.  Both albums include spoken anecdotes from Duvekot.

In 2007, Duvekot's song "Merry-Go-Round" was featured a large-scale marketing campaign for Bank of America, including a high-profile spot during Super Bowl XLI. Duvekot performed for the first time as a professional in Europe, in August 2007, as part of Denmark's Tonder Festival, accompanied by Karan Casey, John Doyle, Liz Carroll, Julie Fowlis, and Mick McAuley.

Duvekot released her second studio CD, The Near Demise of the Highwire Dancer, on Black Wolf Records in March 2009. The album, which features 11 tracks, most of them originals, was produced by singer-songwriter Richard Shindell.

Duvekot's latest album, Toward the Thunder, is her fourth full-length studio album featuring 11 tracks.  The album is her most personal to date and she handled all aspects of the record herself, including designing the cover.

Discography

Solo albums
 Little Peppermints (2002)
 Boys, Flowers, Miles (2005)
 Big Dream Boulevard (Black Wolf Records, 2006)
 Snapshots (Black Wolf Records, 2008)
 The Near Demise of the Highwire Dancer (2009)
 Antje Duvekot LIVE from all over the place (2011)
 New Siberia (2012)
 Toward The Thunder (2016)

Collaborative albums
 Winterbloom: Winter Traditions (2009)
(with Anne Heaton, Meg Hutchinson, and Natalia Zukerman)

 'SOLAS: Reunion – A Decade of SOLAS' (2006)

References

1976 births
American women singer-songwriters
American folk singers
German emigrants to the United States
Living people
Singers from Delaware
Musicians from Boston
Musicians from Somerville, Massachusetts
People from Newark, Delaware
Musicians from Heidelberg
University of Delaware alumni
Songwriters from Delaware
20th-century American women guitarists
20th-century American guitarists
21st-century American women guitarists
21st-century American guitarists
Singer-songwriters from Massachusetts
Guitarists from Delaware
Guitarists from Massachusetts
Guitarists from Pennsylvania
20th-century American women singers
21st-century American women singers
20th-century American singers
21st-century American singers
Singer-songwriters from Pennsylvania